James Bunce is the name of:

Baronets
Sir James Bunce, 1st Baronet (c. 1600–1670), Sheriff of the City of London
Sir James Bunce, 4th Baronet (d. c. 1710) of the Bunce baronets
Sir James Bunce, 6th Baronet (d. 1741) of the Bunce baronets

Others
James Bunce (MP) (1563–1642), MP for City of London
James E. Bunce (1924–2015), American historian

See also
Bunce (surname)
James (disambiguation)